Michele Gallo Vandeinde (born 4 January 1661) was a Roman Catholic prelate who served as Bishop of Capri (1698–1727).

Biography
Michele Gallo Vandeinde was born in Naples, Italy on 4 January 1661.
He was ordained a deacon on 17 December 1689 and ordained a priest on 11 March 1690.
On 15 September 1698, he was appointed during the papacy of Pope Innocent XII as Bishop of Capri.
On 21 September 1698, he was consecrated bishop by Pier Matteo Petrucci, Cardinal-Priest of San Marcello, with Francesco Pannocchieschi d'Elci, Archbishop of Pisa, and Domenico Belisario de Bellis, Bishop of Molfetta, with serving as co-consecrators. 
He served as Bishop of Capri until his resignation on 18 December 1727.

References

External links and additional sources
 (for Chronology of Bishops) 
 (for Chronology of Bishops) 

17th-century Italian Roman Catholic bishops
18th-century Italian Roman Catholic bishops
Bishops appointed by Pope Innocent XII
1727 deaths
1661 births